Sir William MacGregor,  (20 October 1846 – 3 July 1919) was a Lieutenant-Governor of British New Guinea, Governor of Lagos Colony, Governor of Newfoundland and Governor of Queensland.

Early life

MacGregor was born in Hillockhead, parish of Towie, Aberdeenshire, Scotland, the eldest son of John MacGregor, a crofter, and his wife Agnes, daughter of William Smith of Pitprone. MacGregor was educated at the school at the Strathmore manse,  later a teacher at Tillyduke and worked as a farm labourer. Encouraged by his schoolmaster and the local doctor who recognised MacGregor's ability, he entered Aberdeen Grammar School in April 1866 and enrolled at the University of Aberdeen in October 1867. He graduated MB and CM of Aberdeen University in 1872, and obtained his MD in 1874. MacGregor also studied at Anderson's Medical College (LFPS) and the University of Edinburgh (LRCP). MacGregor then became a medical assistant at the Royal Lunatic Asylum, Aberdeen.

Medical career

In February 1873 MacGregor became assistant medical officer at the Seychelles, and in 1874 he was appointed resident at the hospital and superintendent of the lunatic asylum at Mauritius. This brought him under the notice of Sir Arthur Gordon who was then governor of the island, and on Gordon being transferred to Fiji in 1875, he obtained MacGregor's services as chief medical officer of Fiji. There he had to grapple with a terrible epidemic of measles, which resulted in the death of 50,000 natives. In 1877 he was made receiver-general and subsequently a variety of other offices was added, including the colonial secretaryship. On more than one occasion he acted as governor, and was also acting high commissioner and consul-general for the western Pacific.

Doctor MacGregor organised a relief expedition and personally saved several lives; his report made no mention of his own deeds, but they could not remain hidden, and he was given the Albert Medal, and the Clarke gold medal of the Royal Humane Society of Australasia for saving life at sea. In January 1886 he represented Fiji at the meeting of the federal council of Australasia held at Hobart.

Administrator and governor

MacGregor was described as 'sincere, discriminating, and courageous'.  A linguist, MacGregor spoke Italian, French, and German; in one instance when with the Austrian Archduke Ferdinand (1863–1914) in the Territory of Papua, he translated from a German officer to the Italian cook on instructions to cook a wallaby.

British New Guinea (1888–1898) 

MacGregor's experience with native races led to his being appointed administrator of British New Guinea, from 4 September 1888 to 13 March 1895. Here he had to deal with a warlike people separated in many tribes, and his great problem was to get them to live together in reasonable amity. It was necessary at times to make punitive expeditions, but bloodshed was avoided as much as possible, and by tact and perseverance MacGregor eventually brought about a state of law and order. Some of this in part related to the annual headhunting raid and cannibalisation of coastal tribes by the Tugeri warriors, which he ended. He did a large amount of exploration not only along the coast but into the interior. Andrew Gibb Maitland was seconded as geologist in 1891. In 1892 the position was sufficiently settled to enable him to publish a Handbook of Information for intending Settlers in British New Guinea. He was awarded the 1896 Founder's Medal of the Royal Geographical Society for his services to geography.

Administrator MacGregor was appointed lieutenant-governor on 13 March 1895, and retired from this position on 10 September 1898.

Lagos Colony (1899–1904) 

From 1899 to 1904 he was governor of Lagos Colony, Nigeria, where he instituted a campaign against the prevalent malaria, draining the swamps and destroying as far as possible the mosquitoes which were responsible for the spread of the disease. Much other important work in developing the country was done by making roads and building a railway. His efforts to improve the health of his community led to his being given the Mary Kingsley Medal in 1910 by the Liverpool School of Tropical Medicine.

Newfoundland (1904–1909) 

He had been transferred in 1904 to Newfoundland Colony of which he was governor for five years. Here again his medical knowledge was most useful in the combating of tuberculosis which was then very prevalent in Newfoundland. He also did valuable work in dealing with the fisheries question, persuading the contending parties to refer the dispute to the Hague international tribunal which brought about an amicable settlement.

During his term MacGregor saw a general election where two political parties were returned in equal number. The premier Sir Robert Bond sought a dissolution before the House had sat. MacGregor refused. At the House's first sitting, Bond made an unsuccessful motion to nominate a Speaker, then demanded a dissolution. Having suffered a defeat, Governor MacGregor suggested Bond should resign. Sir Edward Morris went to form a ministry, also suffered a majority defeat for chair. With a second general election, Morris was returned with a good majority. MacGregor's actions were approved by many authorities on the subject.

Queensland (1909–1914) 

On 2 December 1909 MacGregor was appointed Governor of Queensland.

MacGregor assisted in the inauguration of the University of Queensland, he agreed to the handing over of his residence Old Government House to be its first home, and one of his first acts as governor was to attend the dedication ceremony on 10 December 1909.  He also became the first chancellor and took great pride in the early development of the university. MacGregor was also president of the Royal Geographical Society of Queensland.

On Saturday, 28 June 1913, going to Townsville in northern Queensland, as a pioneer of tropical medicine himself, Governor MacGregor formally opened the new £2,757 two-storey building for the Institute of Tropical Medicine.  The building (now heritage-listed) at Clifton Street was close and to the west of the general hospital.  The Institute had been in existence for several years prior, and the Governor had visited the facility several times prior.

He chaired the inaugural meeting of the Historical Society of Queensland in August 1913 and became its patron.

MacGregor retired in July 1914 from the governorship.

Later life 

He married in 1883 to Mary Jane, daughter of Levuka (Fiji) harbourmaster Captain Robert and Annie Cocks; who survived him with one son and three daughters.  They met when he was the Administrator of British New Guinea.  She was reported to have been the first Caucasian female born in Fiji.  Two of the daughters were given to be born in Fiji. Lady MacGregor had nearly lost her life to fever on her first visit to her husband when he was the Governor of the Lagos Colony.

He was created a Companion of the Order of St Michael and St George in 1881, advanced to Knight Commander of the Order of St Michael and St George in 1889, made a Companion of the Order of the Bath in 1897, upgraded to Knight Grand Cross of the Order of St Michael and St George in 1907, and was made a privy councillor in 1914. He had the honorary degrees of DSc Cambridge, and LL.D. Aberdeen, Edinburgh, and Queensland.

In 1914 MacGregor retired and went to live on the estate 'Chapel-on-Leader' (near the River Leader, half-way between Lauder and Earlston, Berwickshire, Scotland). During World War I he was able to do a certain amount of war work, and also lectured on his experience of German rule in the Pacific.

MacGregor found his final year to be 'sorrowful', with the deaths of his son-in-law Admiral Sir Alfred Paget on 17 June 1918 of bronchitis, and Paget's wife and MacGregor's daughter Alpina 'Viti' Paget on 13 September 1918. After an operation for intestinal adhesions and gallstones MacGregor died on 3 July 1919, was cremated, and interred beside his parents in the churchyard of Towie, the village where he was born. Lady Mary MacGregor died in December 1919.

From his will, he bequeathed his ethnological and ornithological collections to the University of Aberdeen, and his banner from Saint Paul's Cathedral to the University of Queensland.  In earlier years from his Papuan times, ethnological specimens were collected and presented to the Queensland Museum, bird specimens to the museum in Sydney, and a collection of flora to the botanical department in Melbourne; the latter indicated to have made the botanist Baron Von Mueller 'wildly enthusiastic'.

Two Australian suburbs are named after him: MacGregor, Brisbane, and Macgregor, Canberra.

References

External links

 Biography at Government House The Governorship of Newfoundland and Labrador
 Electric Scotland biography
 
 

1846 births
1919 deaths
Recipients of the Albert Medal (lifesaving)
Alumni of the University of Aberdeen
Alumni of the University of Edinburgh
Companions of the Order of the Bath
Governors of Queensland
Knights Grand Cross of the Order of St Michael and St George
Governors of Newfoundland Colony
Governors of the Dominion of Newfoundland
People from Marr
People educated at Aberdeen Grammar School
Alumni of the University of Strathclyde
19th-century Scottish medical doctors
Scottish colonial officials
Governors of the Lagos Colony
Governors of the Territory of Papua
Members of the Privy Council of the United Kingdom
Fellows of the Royal Scottish Geographical Society